Tyuy is a rural locality (a selo) and the administrative center of Tyuinskoye Rural Settlement, Chernushinsky District, Perm Krai, Russia. The population was 475 as of 2010. There are 5 streets.

Geography 
Tyuy is located 33 km east of Chernushka (the district's administrative centre) by road. Anastasino is the nearest rural locality.

References 

Rural localities in Chernushinsky District